George King Chisholm (September 4, 1814 – April 14, 1874) was an Ontario farmer and political figure.

He was born in Nelson Township in Upper Canada in 1814, the son of William Chisholm. He studied at Upper Canada College and moved to Hamilton, later settling in Oakville. He served in the Gore militia during the Upper Canada Rebellion and the Fenian raids. Chisholm served as reeve of Trafalgar Township from 1830 to 1852. In 1841, he was appointed sergeant-at-arms for the Legislative Assembly of the Province of Canada. In 1849, he was injured during riots when the Rebellion Losses Bill was passed. He resigned in 1854 and was elected to represent Halton in the legislative assembly. He was elected as the first mayor of Oakville in 1857, serving until 1862; he served another term in 1873.

He died in Oakville in 1874.

His brother Robert Kerr served as postmaster.

See also
List of mayors of Oakville, Ontario

External links
Biography at the Dictionary of Canadian Biography Online

1814 births
1874 deaths
Mayors of Oakville, Ontario
Members of the Legislative Assembly of the Province of Canada from Canada West
People of the Fenian raids